Integrator complex subunit 8 is a protein that in humans is encoded by the INTS8 gene.

References

Further reading